is a Japanese professional footballer who plays as Central Midfielder. He currently play for Tiamo Hirakata.

Club career

Born in Osaka Prefecture, Shibamoto joined local side Gamba Osaka as a youth. He was included in the club's under-23 side for the 2017 season, and made his debut on April 15, 2017, coming on as a half time substitute for Takahiro Ko in a 2-0 defeat to Nagano Parceiro. In total he played 29 games and scored 1 goal in 2017 as his side finished 16th out of 17 teams in the final standings.

His performances in J3 didn't go unnoticed and at the age of 18 he was given a senior Gamba Osaka contract ahead of the 2018 season. He was handed the number 32 jersey ahead of his debut season, however, owing to his tender years his top team action was limited to 5 outings as an unused substitute, 3 in J1 League and 2 in the J.League Cup.

Gamba operated a new policy for their J3 side in 2018, utilising it as reserve team as opposed to a youth team as it had been run the previous season.   This limited Shibamoto's game time and he started just 13 times out of a total of 22 appearances and contributed 2 goals as Gamba U-23 finished 6th in the final standings.

After loan at J3 club, SC Sagamihara and Fujieda MYFC for two seasons respectively, he left from the club in 2022 after once play at Gamba Osaka in top tier.

On 26 January 2023, Shibamoto announcement officially transfer to JFL club, Tiamo Hirakata for ahead of 2023 season.

Career statistics

Club
.

Notes

References

External links

 JLeague Profile

1999 births
Living people
People from Minoh, Osaka
Association football midfielders
Japanese footballers
Gamba Osaka players
Gamba Osaka U-23 players
SC Sagamihara players
Fujieda MYFC players
FC Tiamo Hirakata players
J1 League players
J2 League players
J3 League players
Japan Football League players